The following is a list of events affecting Philippine television in 2017. Events listed include television show debuts, finales, cancellations, and channel launches, closures and rebrandings, as well as information about controversies and carriage disputes.

Events

January
 January 30 – Solar Entertainment Corporation aired the live coverage of Miss Universe 2016 together with ABS-CBN, TV5, and GMA.

February
 February 14–15 – The Digital TV Summit was held in Novotel Manila, Quezon City.
 February 28 – Light Network became the first broadcaster to completely switch off its analog transmission. Digital transmission began the following day.

March
 March 2–3 – TV Patrol celebrated its 30th anniversary, becoming the longest-running Filipino news program in the Philippines, since it premiered in 1987.
 March 5 – Maymay Entrata of Cagayan de Oro was hailed as the Big Winner of Pinoy Big Brother Lucky Season 7.
 March 7 – Fox+, a streaming service owned by Fox Networks Group, was launched and became available in the Philippines.
 March 11 – Noven Belleza of Victorias City, Negros Occidental, Visayas was hailed as It's Showtime's first-ever Tawag ng Tanghalan Grand Champion. It was held at the Newport Performing Arts Theater, Resorts World Manila, Pasay.
 March 25 – Maribel Rilo and Aldrin Ocol (#AlBel, Dance Tandem No. 3) was hailed as the first-ever Dancing in Tandem: Nagmahal, Nasaktan, Nagsayaw grand winner on It's Showtime.
 March 31 – Michelle Arceo of Mandaluyong was crowned as the first-ever Gandang Filipina of Wowowin.

April
 April 9 – Awra Briguela of Las Piñas won as the first Your Face Sounds Familiar Kids grand winner. It was held at the Newport Performing Arts Theater, Resorts World Manila, Pasay.
 April 10 – Sky Cable, Sky Direct, Destiny Cable & Sky On Demand was dropped with Solar Entertainment Corporation cable channels: Basketball TV, Jack TV, CT, Solar Sports & NBA Premium TV allegedly due to Sky Cable's unpaid carriage fees. The dispute was occurred just in time for the start of the 2017 NBA playoffs which been held five days later. In addition, Solar terminates the programming involving the boxing matches of Manny Pacquiao, the free-to-air and radio broadcasting rights to Pacquiao's matches with GMA Network and its radio broadcasting arm was not unaffected by this.
 April 12 - eGG Network, a dedicated e-sports and gaming channel owned by MEASAT Satellite Systems (under the joint venture of Rocketfuel Entertainment Sdn Bhd.) through its partner BEAM TV, was launched on digital subchannel via Channel 32 and became available in the Philippines.
 April 21 – President Rodrigo Duterte signs an act regarding the renewal of the television and radio franchises of GMA Network, Inc. for another 25 years in order to provide free public service time equivalent of 10% of all its ad time to the government to relay important public announcements and warnings as well as requiring to make closed captioning available for its programs. Rival network ABS-CBN Corporation also plans to file a renewal for their television and radio franchises following the network was critical by the president for its twisting news reports as well as failing to provide the airtime he had paid for during his election campaign in 2016.
 April 24 – Dobol B sa News TV returns to television after a 5-year hiatus.

May
 May 18 – ABS-CBN Corporation launched "Kapamilya Tickets" (KTX), an online portal that can purchase tickets to get access on its produced live events, shows, and experiences.
 May 20 – Laride Twins (Grand Finalist no. 4) was hailed as Twin It to Win It Grand Winner on It's Showtime.
 May 27 – JC Teves, Debbie Then, Kim Cruz and Arturo Daza were named as the four new myx VJs at the end of  MYX VJ Search 2017.
 May 30 – Angela Lehmann from Bicol was declared as the grand winner of Philippines' Next Top Model: High Street competition.

June
 June 4 – Wacky Kiray was hailed as the first I Can Do That! Greatest Entertainer.
 June 10 – Jhon Clyd Talili of Surigao del Sur emerged as the grand champion of It's Showtime's Tawag ng Tanghalan Kids that spanned for three months.
 June 28 – Maureen Wroblewitz, representing the Philippines, was declared as the grand winner of Asia's Next Top Model (cycle 5).

July
 July 2 – GMA Network broadcasts the boxing match between Manny Pacquiao and Australian boxer Jeff Horn, billed as the "Battle of Brisbane", which took place at Suncorp Stadium in Brisbane, Queensland, Australia. This will be the only Manny Pacquiao's fight to be under the new production ownership of the concert promoter ALV Events International, it is the only Pacquiao fight to be aired exclusively on the said network after they cut ties with Solar Entertainment following the bout against Jessie Vargas In 2016. and it will be the last Pacquiao fight to broadcast on the network after 11 years. The boxing match was also broadcast live on the network's radio station DZBB-AM and the network of RGMA radio stations nationwide; ABS-CBN (through its subsidiary Sky Cable) has also sub-licensed the live broadcast of the fight to all cable and satellite broadcasting affiliates nationwide via pay-per-view; the network also announced that they will broadcast the next bout against Lucas Matthysse next year via tape-delay on its mother network and its rebroadcast on its sister network S+A.
 July 14
 Sarah Lahbati and Richard Gutierrez are engaged. She wears an engagement ring in Switzerland during Its Gutz to be a Gutierrez on E!
 ABS-CBN launched "Kapamilya, Thank You!", a loyalty program tasked to give, earn or redeem points to its customers with gifts, rewards and privileges as a thank you for its support on the network, as well as "Kapamilya Accounts", an authentication scheme system similar to other online services that allows the user to access media-owned sites using an account ID.
 July 27 – MyPhone launched "MyPhone DTV Dongle", a digital TV dongle for Android smartphones.
 July 30 – Jona Soquite of Davao City won as the first-ever The Voice Teens grand champion.

August
 August 1 – MTVph was launched on all cable/satellite providers in the Philippines. It is co-owned by Viacom International Media Networks Asia and Solar Entertainment Corporation.
 August 21 – FPJ's Ang Probinsyano celebrated its 100th week on television.

September
 September 21 – TV personality and former ABS-CBN news reporter Atom Araullo transferred to GMA Network.
 September 28 – FPJ's Ang Probinsyano celebrated its 2nd anniversary on television.
 September 30 – Julia Gonowon of Camarines Sur was crowned as the first ever Miss Millennial Philippines 2017 of noontime show, Eat Bulaga!. It was held at the SM Mall of Asia Arena.

October
 October 6 – After nearly four years, Blink has ceased its operations by OMNI Digital Media Ventures (an affiliate of Solar Entertainment Corporation) due to the review of the management's decision through changes in business direction.
 October 13 – TV5 Network Inc. rebrands its sporting division to ESPN 5 as part of a partnership with The Walt Disney Company and Hearst Corporation, the co-owners of ESPN Inc. the rebranding was held to coinciding with the start of the 2017 PBA Governors' Cup Finals. Prior to the TV5-ESPN partnership, the ESPN branding was formerly used by Fox Networks Group Asia before rebranded to Fox Sports Asia in 2014.
 October 19 – Globe Telecom and Roku, Inc. signed a licensing agreement to utilized a Roku powered system on an upcoming digital media player device made by Globe.
 October 21 – Team Vhong hailed as It's Showtime's eighth anniversary (Magpasikat 2017: Let's Celebr8!) champion.
 October 24 – Globe Telecom launched a digital media player device box, Globe Streamwatch.
 October 30 – Intercontinental Broadcasting Corporation signs on its full digital transmission after a set of test broadcasts; later on November 8, the new station ID was debuted featuring some clips from old IBC programs (excluding programming from the network's primetime blocks (Viva Entertainment's VTV on IBC/Viva TV on IBC, TV5 Network Inc.'s AKTV and Asian Television Content Corporation's ATC @ IBC) as well as some old station IDs from 1975 to 1990 and 1994 onwards (including 1990–92 during Islands TV 13 era).

November
 November 4 – Karen Ibasco was crowned as Miss Earth 2017 held at Mall of Asia Arena, Pasay.
 November 26 – "Titibo-Tibo", a song entry composed by Libertine Amistoso and interpreted by Moira Dela Torre was named as Himig Handog 2017 grand winner held at ABS-CBN. This was aired on ABS-CBN's "ASAP".

December
 December 2 – Donna Cariaga was hailed as Funny One Season 2 grand winner on It's Showtime.
 December 5 – Ika-6 na Utos celebrated its first anniversary on television.
 December 20 – GMA Network and GMA News TV signs on its full-time digital transmissions.
 December 31
 CT officially ceased broadcasting due to low viewership. The closure was announced by Solar a day before the air.
 Dream Satellite TV officially ceased its operations.

Debuts

ABS-CBN

The following are programs that debuted on ABS-CBN:

GMA

The following are programs that debuted on GMA Network:

Unknown
 Lifegiver

TV5

The following are programs that debuted on TV5:

PTV

The following are programs that debuted on People's Television Network:

Other channels
The following are programs that debuted on other minor channels and video streaming services:

Returning or renamed programs

Major networks

Other channels

Programs transferring networks

Major networks

Other channels

Milestone episodes
The following shows made their Milestone episodes in 2017:

Finales

ABS-CBN

The following are programs that ended on ABS-CBN:

Stopped airing
 January 1: Kapamilya Weekend Specials (reason: Filler show for Your Face Sounds Familiar Kids: Season 1 on Pinoy Boyband Superstar's timeslot.)

GMA

The following are programs that ended on GMA Network:

Unknown
 PJM Forum

Stopped airing
 December 21: EZ Shop (reason: Program continued to air on GMA News TV.)

TV5

The following are programs that ended on TV5:

Stopped airing
 August 14: The Tom and Jerry Show (rerun) (reason: series break)
 August 31: Avengers Assemble (season 2)
 September 1: Wabbit (reason: one week only)
 September 3: We Bare Bears and The Powerpuff Girls (2016) (reason: Pulled out to give way new programming lineup of sports, original English audio rerun transferred to CNN Philippines on September 1, 2018)
 November 17: Henry Hugglemonster (season 3) and Doc McStuffins (rerun) (reason: accommodating for ESPN College Basketball)

PTV

The following are programs that ended on People's Television Network:
 March 5: ChinoyTV
 May 5: Good Morning Pilipinas
 June 2: RadyoBisyon

Stopped airing
 July 9: PTV News (reason: the afternoon and primetime newscasts were split into Sentro Balita and Ulat Bayan and the late-night English newscast renamed as PTV News Headlines on July 10)
 September 15: Ulat Bayan (weekday edition) (reason: reviving of PTV News primetime newscast exclusively on weekdays starting September 18)

Other channels

Stopped airing
 January 6: Balen at Balita on CLTV 36
 July 2: D'X-Man on UNTV Public Service
 July 17–28: Two Mothers on GMA News TV (Reason: pre-empted by 700 Club Asia live telethon TV special)
 November 20: Reliable Sources on CNN Philippines

Networks

The following are a list of free-to-air and cable channels or networks launches and closures in 2017.

Launches

Rebranded
The following is a list of television stations or cable channels that have made or will make noteworthy network rebrands in 2017.

Closures

Notes
 : On April 10, the provider pulled-out the channel due to unpaid carriage fees.

Awards
 February: 3rd Students Choice Mass Media Awards, organized by Eastern Visayas State University
 February 18: 4th Paragala Central Luzon Media Awards, organized by Holy Angel University
 November 12: 31st PMPC Star Awards for Television, organized by Philippine Movie Press Club

Deaths

January
 January 17 – Donna Villa, actress, film producer, and wife of Carlo J. Caparas (b. 1960)

February
 February 9 – Rev. Fr. Erick Santos, preacher of Kerygma TV and former host of Family Rosary Crusade (b. 1962)
 February 12 – Herminio Bautista, comedian, director, and former Quezon City councilor (b. 1934)

March
 March 2 – Cornelia "Angge" Lee, radio and talent manager of ABS-CBN (b. 1946)
 March 5 – Roden Araneta, finalist of Clown in a Million, Yes Yes Show mainstay, actor and comedian (b. 1961)

April
 April 17 – Wilfredo Cruz, songwriter (b. 1947)

May
May 2 – Romeo Vasquez, actor (b. 1939)
May 24 – Gil Portes, film director, film producer and screenwriter (b. 1945)

June
June 3 – Carlos "Bobong" Velez, founder of Vintage Television (b. 1945)
June 30 – Jake Tordesillas, writer of GMA Network programs (b. 1948)

July
July 14 – Veronica Alejar, News Anchor, former UNTV and PTV Host and recently host of The Breaking Point and Kilos Pronto (b. 1975)
July 21 – Soxie Topacio, director of GMA Network programs, actor, film and theater director (b. 1951)

August
August 1 – Alfie Lorenzo, talent manager and entertainment columnist (b. 1939)
August 8 – Zeny Zabala, movie and television actress (b. 1937)
August 24 – Amelyn Veloso, News Anchor, former IBC, TV5 and CNN Philippines News Anchor (b. 1974)

September
September 30 – Joe Taruc, News Anchor of DZRH and host of Liberty Live with Joe Taruc/Liberty on TV (b. 1946)

October
 October 9 – Tony Calvento, News Anchor of ABS-CBN (b. 1954)
 October 11 – Emmanuel Borlaza, film director (b. 1935)
 October 15 – Chinggoy Alonzo, actor (b. 1950)
 October 22 – Baldo Marro, actor and director (b. 1948)

November
 November 4 – Isabel Granada, actress and singer (b. 1976)
 November 8 – Alvin Sejera, former IBC 13 news reporter (b. 1987)
 November 11 – Franco Hernandez Lumanlan, dancer and member of It's Showtime's all-male group, Hashtags (b. 1991)

See also
2017 in television

References

 
Television in the Philippines by year
Philippine television-related lists